Trnsko is a neighbourhood of Zagreb, Croatia, located south of Dubrovnik Avenue in Novi Zagreb - zapad. The population is 5,331 (2011).

Trnsko was one of Novi Zagreb's first neighbourhoods constructed in early 1960s. The streets have no names, but the orientation is easy - Trnsko 1 is on the north and Trnsko 49 on the far south of the neighbourhood.

References

External links
 Trnsko.net

Neighbourhoods of Zagreb
Novi Zagreb